The 1450s decade ran from January 1, 1450, to December 31, 1459.

Significant people

References